The Qasim Ali Khan Mosque (Urdu); is a 17th-century mosque in Peshawar, Khyber Pakhtunkhwa, Pakistan. Located  in Qissa Khwani Bazaar, Mohallah Baqir Shah. The mosque was built during Emperor Aurangzeb's reign (1658 to 1707), by Qasim Ali Khan, a news writer and administrator in the government of Kabul. The mosque is situated in the Misgaran Qissa Khwani Bazaar.

Origin
Its creation story is deeply rooted in mythology. The legend has been passed down through generations of residents, creating a conflict amongst scholars and historians concerning the real builders' identities. Another contender includes the engineer that provided its name, Qasim Ali Khan. He was the first to lay a road through the Khyber Pass and was later appointed governor of Kabul and Peshawar.

Khateeb 
Khyber-Pakhtunkhwa's residents invariably begin and end fasting according to an announcement made by the mosque's khateeb – lately Muhammad Shahabuddin Popalzai (6th Khateeb of the Popalzai family).

Shahabuddin’s uncle Abdur Rahim Popalzai II was one of the more documented Popalzais. Born in the 1890s, he took part in the Khilafat Movement in his teens. Mufti Abdur Rahim Popalzai II published a journal by the name of Sarfaroosh and was part of the freedom movement against the British. Upon his death in 1944, his younger brother also known as Mufti, Sarhad Mufti Muhammad Abdul Qayyum Popalzai (1911–1983) took the mantle. He was also a part of various national and international movements including the freedom movement -Tahreek-e-Tahaffuz Khatm-e-Nubuwwat. He was also the companion of Ameer Shariat Syed Attaullah Shah Bukhari, Moulana Ghulam Ghous Hazarvi and Moulana Syed Gul Badshah before passing it on.

References

Mosques in Peshawar
Mughal mosques